Broad Run is the terminal station for Virginia Railway Express' Manassas Line. It is located at 10637 Piper Lane in the Bristow section of unincorporated Prince William County, Virginia, United States, adjacent to Manassas Regional Airport.  It has parking for 885 cars. The station is located on a siding that leads off the 2 track main line. The siding continues to a yard for the Virginia Railway Express.

Amtrak's Cardinal, Crescent and Northeast Regional pass next to the station, but do not stop.

The station opened in 1992 with the inauguration of the line. On March 17, 2017, the VRE Operations Board voted to expand the Broad Run station instead of an extension to Haymarket. This might include relocating the station, as well as expanding the rail yard and parking facilities. The expansion proposition crumbled after officials said it would cost too much.

Station layout

References

External links 
Broad Run VRE Station

Transportation in Prince William County, Virginia
Virginia Railway Express stations
Airport railway stations in the United States
Railway stations in the United States opened in 1992
1992 establishments in Virginia